The 2020 CS Eva u. Horst Faber Cup of Tyrol was scheduled to be held in November 2020 in Innsbruck, Austria. It was part of the 2020–21 ISU Challenger Series. Medals would have been awarded in the disciplines of men's singles, ladies' singles, pair skating, and ice dance.

The Austrian Challenger event was initially announced as the Inge Solar Trophy. Although pair skating was not part of the original program, it was added after two of the originally scheduled Challenger events including pairs were cancelled.

Unlike the previous Challenger events, several non-European skaters were included on the preliminary entry list.

On 3 November the event was cancelled due to the COVID-19 pandemic in Austria.

Entries 
The International Skating Union published the list of entries on 30 October 2020.

Changes to preliminary assignments

References 

CS Cup of Tyrol
Cup of Tyrol
CS Cup of Tyrol